Melanie Ann Winiger (born 22 January 1979) is a Swiss-Canadian actress, model and beauty pageant titleholder who won Miss Switzerland 1996.

Early life
The daughter of a Swiss national and a Canadian of Indian origin, Melanie Winiger was brought up in Ticino, the Italian-speaking region of Switzerland

Modelling career
She won Miss Switzerland in 1996 and represented her country at Miss World 1996 in Bangalore, India and at Miss Universe 1997 in Miami, Florida, not placing in either pageant. Winiger worked as a model in Cape Town, New York, Milan, and Munich in the late 1990s. Around the same time, she gained fame in Switzerland as a TV host and endorser of the Italian boutique chain Oviesse.

Acting
In 2003, she starred in the Swiss movie Achtung, fertig, Charlie!

She subsequently moved to Los Angeles, where she attended the West Hollywood branch of the Lee Strasberg Theatre and Film Institute until 2005.

Since then, she has starred in both American and Swiss film and TV productions, including Sonjas Rückkehr, Love Made Easy, Breakout, and Heldin der Lüfte.

In 2008, she starred in a TV commercial for Moschino, which was aired in several European countries.

Filmography

Film theatre releases 
2003 – Ready, Steady, Charlie! (Achtung, fertig, Charlie!), Swiss Army comedy (Swiss-German)
2006 – Love Made Easy, Road movie (English)
2007 – Breakout, Youth drama (Swiss-German)

2011 - One Way Trip 3D
2011 - 
2013 - Who Killed Johnny, Comedy (Swiss-German, English, German)
2017 - Lommbock

TV Films
2006 – Sonjas Rückkehr Social drama (Swiss-German)
2008 – Heldin der Lüfte, featuring REGA air rescue (Swiss-German)
2010 - Sonntagsvierer
2016 - Spuren der Rache

Awards
 2013 – Hoboken International Film Festival: Best actress, nomination for Who Killed Johnny

Presenter
On 28 August 2008, she hosted the draw for UEFA Champions League groups, which took place at the Grimaldi Forum in Monaco. She hosted the draw again at the same place on 26 August 2010, this time for 2010–11 Champions League and again on 25 August 2011 for the 2011-12 Champions League. Winiger was the host for the opening ceremony at the 61st FIFA Congress.

Again on 27 August 2015 hosted the draw for the group stage of the UEFA Champions League 2015-16 which took place at the Grimaldi Forum in Monaco. On 8 July 2017, she hosted the World Boxing Super Series draw.

References

External links

1979 births
Living people
Miss Switzerland winners
Miss Universe 1997 contestants
Miss World 1996 delegates
 Indian people of Swiss descent
Swiss female models
Swiss film actresses
Swiss people of Canadian descent
Swiss people of Indian descent